The Nazi gun control argument  is the claim that gun regulations in Nazi Germany helped facilitate the rise of the Nazis and the Holocaust. Historians and fact-checkers have characterized the argument as dubious or false, and point out that Jews were under 1% of the population and that it would be unrealistic for such a small population to defend themselves even if they were armed. 

The argument is frequently employed by opponents of gun control in debates on U.S. gun politics, citing security against tyranny. Those against the argument most often call it an example of reductio ad Hitlerum.

Background 

In early 1930s Germany, few citizens owned, or were entitled to own firearms, the Weimar Republic having strict gun control laws. When the Nazi party gained power, some aspects of gun regulation were loosened for Nazi party members only. The laws were tightened in other ways, such as specifically banning ownership of guns by Jews. Nazi laws systematically disarmed so-called "unreliable" persons, especially Jews while relaxing restrictions for Nazi party members. The policies were later expanded to include the confiscation of arms in occupied countries.

Argument 
According to gun rights activist Neal Knox, the Nazi gun control hypothesis was first suggested in a 1992 book by Jay Simkin and Jews for the Preservation of Firearms Ownership (JPFO) founder Aaron S. Zelman. In it, they compared the German gun laws of 1928 and 1938, and the U.S. Congressional hearings preceding the Gun Control Act of 1968. On the basis of an unusual request made by Thomas J. Dodd—who was in Germany following the war as a prosecutor during the Nuremberg trials. Prior to Dodd proposing his key piece of gun control legislation, the Gun Control Act of 1968, Dodd specifically requested from Library of Congress staffers to translate a copy of the German Nazi Weapons Law of 1938 that Dodd had brought back with him following the trials at Nuremberg. Supporters of the Nazi gun control argument use the translation request of Dodd's as part of a smoking gun piece of evidence for why, at least regarding the Gun Control Act of 1968, is claimed to have been based on the Nazi weapons laws.

In a 2000 article, NRA attorney Stephen Halbrook said he was presenting "the first scholarly analysis of the use of gun control laws and policies to establish the Hitler regime and to render political opponents and especially German Jews defenseless." In the article, he cites an Adolf Hitler quote: "the most foolish mistake we could possibly make would be to allow the subject races to possess arms." Other gun advocates such as Halbrook, Zelman, and National Rifle Association (NRA) leader Wayne LaPierre have proposed that Nazi Party policies and laws were an enabling factor in the Holocaust, that prevented its victims from implementing an effective resistance.  Associate professor of criminal justice M Dyan McGuire wrote in her 2011 book: "It is frequently argued that these laws, which resulted in the confiscation of weapons not belonging to supporters of the Nazis, rendered the Jews and other disfavored groups like the Gypsies, homosexuals, Poles, and their potential allies defenseless and set the stage for the slaughter of the Holocaust that followed."

The Nazi gun control argument has been used as a "security against tyranny" argument in U.S. gun politics.

Legal scholar and historian Robert Cottrol has argued that other authoritarian regimes such as the Khmer Rouge could have been inhibited by more private gun ownership.

A 2011 open letter from Dovid Bendory, who was the rabbinic director of JPFO, to then New York City mayor Michael Bloomberg,  asked: "Are you aware that the Nazis disarmed Jews prior to Kristallnacht and that those same Nazi gun laws are the foundation of the U.S. Gun Control Act of 1968?"

In October 2015, U.S. Republican Presidential Primaries candidate Ben Carson said that Hitler's mass murder of Jews "would have been greatly diminished" if Germans had not been disarmed by the Nazis.

In February 2018, U.S. Republican Representative Don Young prosed the question "How many Jews were put in the ovens because they were unarmed?"

Criticism 
Fact-checkers have described this theory as "false" or "debunked".

In a 2011 magazine piece, law professor Mark Nuckols says Nazi gun control hypotheses are part of a "shaky intellectual edifice" underlying "belief in widespread gun ownership as a defense against tyrannical government." He says the idea is "gaining traction with members of Congress as well as fringe conspiracy theorists." In his 2011 book, fellow law professor Adam Winkler says: "This radical wing of the gun rights movement focuses less on the value of guns for self-defense against criminals than on their value for fighting tyranny." He says the militia groups that grew in number across the U.S. after the early 1990s organized "to fight off what they saw as an increasingly tyrannical federal government and what they imagined was the inevitable invasion of the United States by the United Nations." Winkler wrote that "[to] some on the fringe," the Brady Bill "was proof that the government was determined to deprive Americans of their constitutional rights."

Because mainstream scholars argue that gun laws in Germany were already strict prior to Hitler, gun-control advocates may view the hypothesis as a form of reductio ad Hitlerum. In a 2004 issue of the Fordham Law Review, legal scholar Bernard Harcourt said Halbrook "perhaps rightly" could say that he made the first scholarly analysis of his Nazi-gun-registration subject, but as a gun-rights litigator, not as a historian. Harcourt called on historians for more research and serious scholarship on Nazi gun laws. "Apparently," Harcourt wrote, "the historians have paid scant attention to the history of firearms regulation in the Weimar Republic and the Third Reich."  According to Harcourt, "Nazis were intent on killing Jewish persons and used the gun laws and regulations to further the genocide," but the disarming and killing of Jews was unconnected with Nazi gun control policy, and it is "absurd to even try to characterize this as either pro- or anti-gun control." If he had to choose, Harcourt said, the Nazi regime was pro-gun compared with the Weimar Republic that preceded it. He says that gun rights advocates disagree about the relationship between Nazi gun control and the Holocaust, with many distancing themselves from the idea. Political scientist Robert Spitzer said (in the same law review as Harcourt, who stated the same thing) the quality of Halbrook's historical research is poor. In reference to Halbrook's hypothesis that gun control leads to authoritarian regimes, Spitzer says that "actual cases of nation-building and regime change, including but not limited to Germany, if anything support the opposite position."

Regarding the "Nazi gun control theory", anthropologist Abigail Kohn wrote in her 2004 book:Such counterfactual arguments are problematic because they reinvent the past to imagine a possible future. In fact, Jews were not well-armed and were not able to adequately defend themselves against Nazi aggression. Thus, reimagining a past in which they were and did does not provide a legitimate basis for arguments about what might have followed.

In the encyclopedic 2012 book, Guns in American Society, Holocaust scholar Michael Bryant says Halbrook, LaPierre, Zelman, Dave Kopel, and others' "use of history has selected factual inaccuracies, and their methodology can be questioned."

In January 2013, Anti-Defamation League (ADL) director Abraham Foxman said in a press release: "The idea that supporters of gun control are doing something akin to what Hitler's Germany did to strip citizens of guns in the run-up to the Second World War is historically inaccurate and offensive, especially to Holocaust survivors and their families." Later that year, Jewish groups and Jersey City, New Jersey, mayor Steven Fulop criticized the NRA for comparing gun control supporters to Nazi Germany. The Jewish Federation of Greater MetroWest NJ released a statement saying: "Access to guns and the systematic murder of six million Jews have no basis for comparison in the United States or in New Jersey. The Holocaust has no place in this discussion and it is offensive to link this tragedy to such a debate."

See also 
 Disarmament of the German Jews
 Gun Control in the Third Reich (book)
 Jewish resistance in German-occupied Europe
 Warsaw Ghetto Uprising

References

Bibliography

Further reading 
Works that argue that gun control serves as a necessary, though not sufficient condition, for Genocide
 
 
 
 
 

Works that criticize Nazi gun control arguments
 
 
 

1992 introductions
Fringe theories
Gun politics in the United States
Law in Nazi Germany